Benjamin Cavet (born 1 January 1994) is a freestyle skier specialising in mogul skiing. Born in England, at age 10, he moved to France with his parents and joined the Chatel ski club. He became a French citizen in 2012, after not having been offered funding from the UK. He competed for France in the moguls at the Winter Olympics 2014.

In 2014, he placed eighth in the Sochi Winter Olympics, had his first podium in World Cup in La Plagne, France, and became Junior World Champion in dual moguls.

In 2016, Cavet was on the podium three times and finished third overall in the FIS World Cup series. The season 2016–17 was the most successful yet for Cavet; he was on the podium six times in World Cup Moguls and finished 2nd overall. At the World Championships in Sierra Nevada, Spain, he was crowned vice-world champion.

References

External links

1994 births
Living people
Olympic freestyle skiers of France
Freestyle skiers at the 2014 Winter Olympics
Freestyle skiers at the 2018 Winter Olympics
Freestyle skiers at the 2022 Winter Olympics
Sportspeople from Maidstone
French male freestyle skiers
Université Savoie-Mont Blanc alumni
Universiade gold medalists for France
Universiade bronze medalists for France
Universiade medalists in freestyle skiing
Competitors at the 2019 Winter Universiade
English emigrants to France
People from Crowborough
Sportspeople from East Sussex